Kevin Arnott may refer to:
Kevin Arnott (cricketer) (born 1961), former Zimbabwean cricketer
Kevin Arnott (footballer) (born 1958), English footballer